is a major railway station in the Takanawa and Konan districts of Minato, Tokyo, Japan, operated by East Japan Railway Company (JR East), Central Japan Railway Company (JR Central), and the private railway operator Keikyu. The Tokaido Shinkansen and other trains to the Miura Peninsula, Izu Peninsula, and the Tōkai region pass through here. Though a major station in Tokyo, Shinagawa is not served by the Tokyo subway network. However, it is connected to the Toei Asakusa Line via Keikyu through services.

Despite its name, the station is not located in Shinagawa ward. Shinagawa is also commonly used to refer to the business district around the station, which is in Takanawa and Konan neighborhoods of Minato, directly north of Shinagawa ward.

This station is just south of a large yard complex consisting of Shinagawa Carriage Sidings, Shinagawa Locomotive Depot, and Tamachi Depot.

Lines
Shinagawa is served by the following lines:

JR Central
  Tokaido Shinkansen

JR East

Keikyu
  Keikyu Main Line

JR Central announced in 2011 that Shinagawa will be the terminal for the Chūō Shinkansen, a maglev line under construction and scheduled to begin service to Nagoya in 2027.

Station layout
The main JR station concourse is situated above the platforms running east–west across the breadth of the station. A freely traversable walkway divides the station into two sections. The southerly section contains a number of shops and market-style stalls which form the "e-cute" station complex.

Cross-platform interchange between the Yamanote and Keihin-Tohoku lines is only available for Yamanote Line trains to Shibuya and Keihin-Tōhoku Line trains to Tokyo. 

The Keikyu platforms are on the western side of the station at a higher level than the JR platforms.

The Shinkansen platforms were opened on October 1, 2003, to relieve
congestion at Tokyo Station. Platforms are on the east side of the station.

JR platforms

Platform 8 is used for temporary timetables due to construction work or other obstructions elsewhere, or other special services and uses. As an example, in 2021, JR East stabled a Narita Express train at the platform and rented out seats as temporary teleworking spaces.

Shinkansen platforms

Keikyu platforms

History

Shinagawa is one of Japan's oldest stations, opened on 12 June 1872, when the service between Shinagawa and Yokohama provisionally started, four months before the inauguration of "Japan's first railway" between Shimbashi and Yokohama through Shinagawa on 14 October 1872. This line is a part of the Tōkaidō Main Line. Nothing remains of the original structure.

Later on 1 March 1885, the Yamanote Line started operation. Takanawa station of the Keikyu Line (then Keihin Railway Line) opened on 11 March 1924 across the street from Shinagawa station. Takanawa station was renamed Shinagawa station and moved to the current site on 1 April 1933.

The station concourse on the eastern side of the station (located above the platforms) was extensively redeveloped in 2003 in connection with the construction of the Shinkansen platforms and also to improve access to the new commercial development "Shinagawa Intercity".

Keikyu introduced station numbering to its stations on 21 October 2010; Shinagawa was assigned station number KK01.

Station numbering was introduced to the JR East platforms in 2016 with Shinagawa being assigned station numbers JT03 for the Tokaido Line, JO17 for the Yokosuka Line, JK20 for the Keihin-Tohoku Line, and JY25 for the Yamanote Line. At the same time, JR East assigned the station a 3-letter code; Shinagawa was assigned the code "SGW".

Passenger statistics
In fiscal 2017, the JR East station was used by an average of 378,566 passengers daily (boarding passengers only), making it the fifth-busiest station operated by JR East. The passenger figures for previous years are as shown below.

Surrounding area

West side (Takanawa Exit)
 Takanawa Keikyu Hotel
 Takanawa Tobu Hotel
 Grand Prince Hotel Takanawa
 Shinagawa Prince Hotel
 Aqua Park Shinagawa
 National Route 15

East side (Konan Exit)
 Shinagawa Inter City
 Tokyo University of Marine Science and Technology

Bus services
Services are provided by Toei Bus, Tokyu Bus, Keikyu Bus, Airport Transport Service, and others.

See also

 List of railway stations in Japan
 Transport in Greater Tokyo

References

External links

 Shinagawa Station information (JR East) 
 Shinagawa Station information (JR Central) 
 Shinagawa Station information (Keikyu) 

Keihin-Tōhoku Line
Keikyū Main Line
Railway stations in Japan opened in 1872
Stations of Central Japan Railway Company
Stations of East Japan Railway Company
Stations of Keikyu
Tōkaidō Main Line
Tōkaidō Shinkansen
Yamanote Line
Yokosuka Line
Buildings and structures in Minato, Tokyo